A caliph is the head of state in a caliphate, and the title for the leader of the Islamic Ummah, an Islamic community ruled by the Shari'ah

Khalifa is the Arabic word for caliph.

Caliph may also refer to:

USS Caliph (SP-272), a United States Navy patrol vessel
Enispe (butterfly), a genus of butterflies also known as caliphs
Caliph, South Australia, a locality in the Murray Mallee region of South Australia, Australia

See also
List of caliphs
Caliphate (disambiguation)
Khalifa (Morocco)